Bomi-3 is an electoral district for the elections to the House of Representatives of Liberia. The district covers the Seuhn Mecca District, parts of Dewoin District (i.e. the communities of Bonor, Benda, Zohn Bamon, Bowein, Vincent, Jenneh, Bogbeh, Leyan, Dagweh and Weajor) as well as the Gonjeh community of Klay District.

Elected representatives

References

Electoral districts in Liberia